Sahodrabai Devi Rai (30 April 1919 – 26 March 1981) was an Indian politician who was a member of the Indian National Congress and served four terms as an MP.

Life and career
She won the 1957 general election of India from Sagar Lok Sabha constituency. Rai was also elected in 1971 and 1980 general elections of India, also from the Sagar Lok Sabha constituency. She was a member of the 2nd, 5th and 7th Lok Sabhas of India. She was member of 3rd Lok Sabha from Damoh

Rai worked for Hindu–Muslim unity in Noakhali and participated in satyagraha (loosely translated as "insistence on truth") against the British, in 1945. She was also arrested with Indira Gandhi in 1979 and imprisoned for a day.

She died in March 1981 at the age of 61.

See also

 List of people from Madhya Pradesh

References

1919 births
1981 deaths
20th-century Indian politicians
20th-century Indian women politicians
India MPs 1957–1962
India MPs 1962–1967
India MPs 1971–1977
India MPs 1980–1984
Indian National Congress politicians from Madhya Pradesh
Lok Sabha members from Madhya Pradesh
People from Damoh district
People from Sagar district
Women in Madhya Pradesh politics
Women members of the Lok Sabha